6th Cavalry Division may refer to:

 6th Cavalry Division (German Empire)
 6th Cavalry Division (Russian Empire)
 6th Cavalry Division (Soviet Union)